Sékou Berthé (born 7 October 1977) is a Malian former professional footballer who played as a centre-back.

Club career
Berthé was born in Bamako, Mali.

Troyes
On 7 August 2001, he played for Troyes in a 0–0 draw against Newcastle United in the 2001 UEFA Intertoto Cup.

West Brom
On 23 September 2003, Berthé had his full starting League Cup debut for West Bromwich Albion against Hartlepool United, they went on to win 2–1. On 4 October 2003, he made his full starting Championship league debut for West Brom against Gillingham. In February 2005, he agreed the termination of his contract with West Brom.

Panionios
On 27 October 2007, Berthe played 90 minutes in Panionios F.C.'s 1–1 draw against Helsingborgs in the 2007–08 UEFA Cup. On 6 December 2007, Berthe played 90 minutes away to Austria Wien in the UEFA Cup. On 19 December 2007, Panionios lost 3–2 at home to Bordeaux in the UEFA Cup which resulted in Panionios finishing 4th in Group H and being unable to proceed to the next round.

Persepolis
On 21 October 2010, Berthé commenced training with Iranian Pro League giants Persepolis. On 13 November 2010, he signed a six-month deal with the club.

Career statistics

Club

References

Honours
Persepolis
 Hazfi Cup: 2010–11

External links
 
 
 

1977 births
Living people
Sportspeople from Bamako
Association football central defenders
Malian footballers
Mali international footballers
Ligue 1 players
English Football League players
Super League Greece players
Persian Gulf Pro League players
ES Troyes AC players
West Bromwich Albion F.C. players
Panionios F.C. players
Persepolis F.C. players
Expatriate footballers in Greece
Expatriate footballers in France
Expatriate footballers in Monaco
Expatriate footballers in England
Expatriate footballers in Iran
Malian expatriate footballers
Malian expatriate sportspeople in Greece
Malian expatriate sportspeople in Monaco
21st-century Malian people